Quriwayrachina (Quechua, other spellings Qori Huayrachina, Qori Wayrachina, Ccorihuayrachina, Ccoriwayrachina, Corihuayrachina, Coriwayrachina, Qorihuayrachina, Qoriwayrachina, Q'oriwayrachina) may refer to:

Quriwayrachina, Anta, an archaeological site in the Anta Province, Cusco Region, Peru
Quriwayrachina, Ayacucho, an archaeological site in the Ayacucho Region, Peru
Quriwayrachina, La Convención, an archaeological site in the Vilcabamba District, La Convención Province, Cusco Region, Peru
Quriwayrachina (Vilcabamba), a mountain in the Vilcabamba District, La Convención Province, Cusco Region, Peru